The uninhabited Payne Islands are an archipelago, members of the Arctic Archipelago and the Ungava Bay Archipelago, in the Qikiqtaaluk Region of Nunavut, Canada. They are located in Payne Bay, a waterway in western Ungava Bay, just east of the Arnaud River (formerly the Payne River) and the community of Kangirsuk on Quebec's Ungava Peninsula.

Note: The Atlas of Canada does not recognise this appellation; presumably the Payne Islands are the islets of Nanuk, Agvik, and Akunok.

Geography
The islands have a hard granitic gneiss and a thin layer of soil.

Flora
Their habitat includes lichen, moss, sedges, and low woody shrubs.

Fauna
Combined with the Plover Islands, the Payne Islands are a Canadian Important Bird Area (#NU027). Notable bird species include the common eider and colonial waterbirds/seabirds.

The Payne Islands are a part of the Ungava Bay Archipelagoes, a Key Migratory Terrestrial Bird Site (NU Site 51).

References 

 Plover Islands at Atlas of Canada

External links 
 Payne Bay in the Atlas of Canada - Toporama; Natural Resources Canada

Uninhabited islands of Qikiqtaaluk Region
Important Bird Areas of Qikiqtaaluk Region
Seabird colonies